Mary Slagle Zappone (born July 15, 1964), daughter of James Robert Slagle, is an American businesswoman notable for her achievements in business transformation and encouraging women in STEM. Zappone sits on the Board of Directors of financial technology firm Blucora and serves as Chief Executive Officer of Sundyne. She has held previous appointments as CEO of Brace Industrial, CEO of Service Champ, the largest distributor of consumable automotive aftermarket maintenance parts, CEO of RecoverCare LLC, engagement manager at McKinsey and Company, President at Alcoa, in addition to roles at Tyco International, General Electric, and ExxonMobil. She has held positions on notable private boards including Supplies Over Seas, American Heart Association, and continues to sit on Johns Hopkins University's Department of Chemical and Biomolecular Engineering in the Whiting School of Engineering.

Education 
Zappone received her Bachelor of Science in Chemical Engineering from Johns Hopkins University in 1986 and her MBA from Columbia Business School.

CEO roles 
Zappone serves as CEO of Sundyne. She has held previous appointments as CEO of Brace Industrial, a Sterling Partners portfolio company, CEO of ServiceChamp, backed by Manhattan-based private equity firm Snow Phipps, and CEO of RecoverCare LLC, a national healthcare equipment provider controlled by Los Angeles-based investment firm Aurora Capital, prior to its merger with Joerns Healthcare in 2015. Zappone was appointed to Blucora's Board of Directors in March 2015.

Writing
Zappone has written for industry-related publications such as Power Engineering International.

Personal life 
Mary married John Zappone, a Chemical Engineering classmate at Johns Hopkins University, in September 1986 while the two were pursuing MBA degrees at Columbia.
The couple has three daughters who each pursued degrees in STEM – Frances (born 1992, now Frances Zappone Casella) and Sarah (born 1996) attended the Whiting School of Engineering at Johns Hopkins University while Anna (born 1994, now Anna Zappone Allaby) attended Stanford University. Zappone has brushed off questions regarding work life balance in interviews, once saying "it's just one big life," and has been cited to enjoy cooking, traveling and practicing yoga with her daughters.

References 

American women chief executives
Living people
1964 births
American women scientists
Columbia Business School alumni
Whiting School of Engineering alumni